The 1893–94 season was Newcastle United's first season in The Football League after they, and Middlesbrough Ironopolis, were elected to the Second Division from the Northern League.

Appearances and Goals

Competitions

League

FA Cup

Friendlies

Matches

League

FA Cup

Friendlies

References

External links
Newcastle United - Historical Football Kits
Season Details - 1893-94 - toon1892
Newcastle United 1893-1894 Home - statto.com

Newcastle United F.C. seasons
Newcastle United